Likarion Wainaina (born 20 August 1987), is a Russian–born Kenyan filmmaker. He is best known as the director of critically acclaimed shorts Between the Lines and Bait as well as most awarded Kenyan film in history, Supa Modo. Apart from filmmaking, he is also a cinematographer, editor, producer and actor.

Personal life
He was born on 20 August 1987 in Moscow, Russia to Kenyan parents. When he was four years old, he moved to Kenya with his family. He has one sister and two brothers.

Career
He started by making films and then later moved to theater. He has been a member of the Phoenix Players theater in Nairobi since 2007. Later he worked as a theater director. In the meantime, he also worked in the film industry as a gaffer and cinematographer. As a cinematographer he worked on a number of documentaries, commercials and television sitcoms. In 2013, he founded the company Kibanda Pictures.

In 2013, he made the short film Between the Lines which later became the first Kenyan Film to be projected on an IMAX screen in Kenya. The short received critical acclaim and then nominated at the AMCVA awards 2015 for Best New Online Media Award. Then he directed the short film Bait in 2015, which was selected at the 48-Hour Film Project Festival. The shot also won several awards including Best Director, Audience Choice awards and Judges Choice awards. It was also selected as one of the top short films screened at the 2016 Cannes Film Festival. In 2018, he produced short film, My Faith, which won the Best East African Film during the Mashariki Film Festival.

In 2018, he made his acting debut with the film Wavamizi. Then in the same year, he made his directorial debut with the film Supa Modo, which was critically acclaimed. The film had its premiere at 68th Berlin International Film Festival. It was later selected as the Kenyan entry for the Best Foreign Language Film at the 91st Academy Awards, but it was not nominated. With all these awards, the film becoming the most-awarded film in Kenya and a critics’ favorite.

He worked for television commercial advertisements for Pascha milk and Santa Maria. He has directed nine Africa Magic Original Films (AMOF) and a TV sitcom titled Classmates. In 2016, he made the television serial Auntie Boss! which aired on NTV after the death of original director Derrick Omfwoko Aswani. Meanwhile, he was the cinematographer for the music videos of Sarabi Band which made 'Tumechoka' and 'Haujali' as well as cinematography in the music video 'Loneliness' sung by Liron.

Filmography

See also
 List of Kenyan submissions for the Academy Award for Best International Feature Film
 List of submissions to the 91st Academy Awards for Best Foreign Language Film
 Filmfest Hamburg
 Zlín Film Festival
 Zanzibar International Film Festival
 2015 Africa Magic Viewers Choice Awards
 List of Kenyan films

References

External links
 

Living people
Kenyan male film actors
1987 births
Kenyan film directors
Kenyan male television actors